Revelation 20 is the twentieth chapter of the Book of Revelation or the Apocalypse of John in the New Testament of the Christian Bible. The book is traditionally attributed to John the Apostle, but the precise identity of the author remains a point of academic debate. This chapter contains the notable account of the "Millennium" and the judgment of the dead.

Text
The original text was written in Koine Greek. This chapter is divided into 15 verses.

Textual witnesses
Some early manuscripts containing the text of this chapter are among others:
Codex Sinaiticus (AD 330-360)
Codex Alexandrinus (400-440)

The Millennium (20:1–10)
This passage is the basis for various tradition of Christian 'millenarianism'.

Verse 1
I saw an angel coming down from heaven, having the key to the bottomless pit and a great chain in his hand.
Jesus Christ says in the writer's vision at Revelation 1:18, "I hold the keys of Hades and of Death", leading some interpreters to suggest that the angel observed here is actually Christ. The 17th-century theologian John Gill refers to a suggestion that the prophesied angel was fulfilled in Constantine the Great (272–337 AD). The Ethiopic version reads "the key of the sun".

Verse 2
He laid hold of the dragon, that serpent of old, who is the Devil and Satan, and bound him for a thousand years;
"The dragon" is the 'ultimate principle of evil', which appeared before the narrative of the two beasts (chapter 12–13), and continues after both of them have perished.

Verse 3
and he cast him into the bottomless pit, and shut him up, and set a seal on him, so that he should deceive the nations no more till the thousand years were finished. But after these things he must be released for a little while.
"Cast him into the bottomless pit": In chapter 12 the dragon was 'thrown from heaven to earth, where he deceived the nations' and now is thrown into the imprisonment in the abyss (cf. ), prevented to deceive the nations for a long time (cf.  for the significance of 'a thousand year').

Verse 4
And I saw thrones, and they sat on them, and judgment was committed to them. Then I saw the souls of those who had been beheaded for their witness to Jesus and for the word of God, who had not worshiped the beast or his image, and had not received his mark on their foreheads or on their hands. And they lived and reigned with Christ for a thousand years.
It is not explicit or clear who was seated on the thrones. "The natural construction is that 'judges' sat on them. The New International Version presents the text as:
I saw thrones on which were seated those who had been given authority to judge ...
American theologian Albert Barnes notes the "considerable resemblance, in many respects, between this [wording] and the statement in ":
As I looked, thrones were set in place, and the Ancient of Days took his seat.
Daniel's vision continues:
The Ancient of Days came, and judgment was given for the saints of the Most High, and the time came when the saints possessed the kingdom 
and so the Cambridge Bible for Schools and Colleges argues that those seated on the thrones are these saints of the Most High.

Verse 5
But the rest of the dead lived not again until the thousand years were finished. This is the first resurrection.
Revelation 2:8).

Verse 6
Blessed and holy is he who has part in the first resurrection. Over such the second death has no power, but they shall be priests of God and of Christ, and shall reign with Him a thousand years.
"Of God and of Christ": This provides a strong proof for "the doctrine of Christ's coequal Deity" with God (= "The Father").

The Judgement of the Dead (20:11-15)

Verse 12
And I saw the dead, small and great, standing before God, and books were opened. And another book was opened, which is the Book of Life. And the dead were judged according to their works, by the things which were written in the books.
The reference to "judgment based on works" is repeated in verse 13. Biblical commentator Andrew Robert Fausset stresses that "we are justified by faith, judged according to (not by) our works".

Verse 15
And anyone not found written in the Book of Life was cast into the lake of fire.

See also
 Book of Life
 Dudael
 Jesus Christ
 John's vision of the Son of Man
 Lake of Fire
 Millennialism
 Names and titles of Jesus in the New Testament
 That Evening Sun
 Related Bible parts: Revelation 4, Revelation 7, Revelation 13, Revelation 18, Revelation 19, Revelation 21

Notes

References

Sources

External links
 King James Bible - Wikisource
English Translation with Parallel Latin Vulgate 
Online Bible at GospelHall.org (ESV, KJV, Darby, American Standard Version, Bible in Basic English)
Multiple bible versions at Bible Gateway (NKJV, NIV, NRSV etc.)

20